The Men's -66 kg competition at the 2010 World Judo Championships was held at 12 September at the Yoyogi National Gymnasium in Tokyo, Japan. 82 competitors contested for the medals, being split in 4 Pools where the winner advanced to the medal round.

Pool A
Last 32 fights:
 Andreas Krassas 000 vs.  Miloš Mijalković 111
 Musa Mogushkov 112 vs.  Levar Arthur 000
 Junpei Morishita 100 vs.  Ulugbek Norkobilov 000

Pool B
Lats 32 fights:
 Yazan Zahedah 000 vs.  Ruslan Uulu 100
 Tomasz Kowalski 001 vs.  Sasha Mehmedovic 000

Pool C
Last 32 fights:
 Sergey Lim 000 vs.  Deniss Kozlovs 100
 Ivo dos Santos 100 vs.  Bruno Luzia 000
 Sergiy Pliyev 002 vs.  Islam Baialinov 000

Pool D
Last 32 fights:
 Wen Dusu 100 vs.  Amornthep Namwiset 000
 Kenneth Hashimoto 010 vs.  Farukhruz Sobirov 000

Repechage

Finals

References

 Results

External links
 
 Official Site 

M66
World Judo Championships Men's Half Lightweight